Dracula Has Risen from the Grave is a 1968 British supernatural horror film directed by Freddie Francis and produced by Hammer Film Productions. It is the fourth entry in Hammer's Dracula series, and the third to feature Christopher Lee as Count Dracula, the titular vampire. The film stars Rupert Davies as a clergyman who exorcises Dracula's castle, and in doing so, unwittingly resurrects the Count back from the dead.

Dracula Has Risen from the Grave also stars Veronica Carlson, Barry Andrews, Barbara Ewing, Ewan Hooper, and Michael Ripper. It was followed by Taste the Blood of Dracula in 1970.

Plot
In 1905, in an East European village, a young altar boy (Norman Bacon) discovers the corpse of a young woman crammed inside a church bell, another victim of Count Dracula. One year later, following the events of the previous film, Dracula has been destroyed. Monsignor Ernst Mueller (Rupert Davies) comes to the village on a routine visit only to find the altar boy is now a frightened mute and the priest (Ewan Hooper) has lost his faith. The villagers refuse to attend Mass at the church because the shadow of Dracula's castle touches it. To bring to an end the villagers' fears, Mueller climbs to the castle to exorcise it.

The terrified priest follows only partway up the mountain, and Mueller continues alone. As he exorcises the castle, attaching a large metal cross to its gate, a thunderstorm occurs. The fleeing priest stumbles and is knocked unconscious when his head strikes a rock. The blood from the head wound trickles into a frozen stream through a crack in the ice and onto the lips of Dracula, reviving him. Mueller returns to the village, reassures the villagers, and returns to his home city of Keinenberg, where he lives with his widowed sister-in-law, Anna (Marion Mathie).

Unknown to Mueller, Dracula takes control of the priest. Furious that his castle is now barred to him, Dracula forces the enslaved priest to reveal the name of the exorcist. The priest desecrates a coffin to provide a sleeping place for Dracula and leads him to Keinenberg, where the Count determines to take his revenge on Mueller's beautiful niece, Maria (Veronica Carlson). Dracula enslaves a tavern girl named Zena (Barbara Ewing). Zena almost succeeds in bringing Maria under Dracula's power, but Maria's boyfriend Paul (Barry Andrews), who lives and works in the bakery beneath the tavern, rescues her. Dracula kills Zena and orders the priest to destroy her corpse before she turns into a vampire, so the priest burns her body in the bakery ovens. The priest then helps Dracula locate Maria. Dracula climbs over the rooftops of nearby buildings, enters Maria's room, and bites her.

Mueller enters Maria's room just after Dracula has bitten the girl and pursues a fleeing figure across the rooftops. He is knocked down by the priest. Mueller makes his way back home, where his sister-in-law cares for him. He summons Paul, knowing that he will help protect Maria because of his love for her. Mueller passes on a book, which contains the rites of protection against vampires and ways to defeat them, before he succumbs to his wounds. Paul enlists the priest, not knowing he is under Dracula's spell. Unable to break free from Dracula's influence, the priest attacks Paul as they watch over Maria, who is falling under Dracula's spell. Paul defeats the priest and forces him to lead the way to Dracula's lair. They try to stake Dracula through the heart, but the faithless priest and the atheist Paul are not able to say the required prayer, so Dracula rises and removes the stake himself. He kidnaps Maria and flees to the castle, pursued by Paul and the priest.

At the castle, Dracula orders Maria to remove the cross from the door. She throws it over the parapet into the ravine below, where it lands upright, wedged between the rocks. Paul fights Dracula on the parapet and throws him over the side, and he is impaled on the cross. The priest, freed from the vampire's influence, recites the Lord's Prayer in Latin before collapsing and Dracula perishes, dissolving into dust. Reunited with Maria and having apparently regained his Christian faith, Paul crosses himself while viewing Dracula's remains.

Cast

 Christopher Lee as Count Dracula
 Veronica Carlson as Maria Mueller
 Barry Andrews as Paul
 Rupert Davies as Monsignor Ernst Mueller 
 Ewan Hooper as Priest
 Barbara Ewing as Zena
 Marion Mathie as Anna Mueller
 Michael Ripper as Max
 John D. Collins as Student
 George A. Cooper as Landlord
 Chris Cunningham as Farmer
 Norman Bacon as Altar boy

Production
This Hammer Dracula production was shot at Pinewood Studios situated in Iver Heath, Buckinghamshire. Missing are the approach road, coach path and moat seen in front of Castle Dracula in Dracula (1958) and Dracula: Prince of Darkness (1966). Those films were made at Bray Studios.

The film was photographed by Arthur Grant using colored filters belonging to director Freddie Francis, also a cameraman, who used them when photographing The Innocents (1961). Whenever Dracula (or his castle) is in a scene, the frame edges are tinged crimson, amber and yellow. Initially Terence Fisher was to direct the film, but dropped out after breaking his leg in an automobile accident; Freddie Francis stepped in.

Release

Censorship
In Australia, the film was the first Hammer Dracula to be passed by the censors; the previous films Dracula and Dracula: Prince of Darkness were banned. The film was slightly censored and ran for a three-week season at Sydney's Capitol theater in January 1970.

Critical reception

Howard Thompson of The New York Times wrote, "Dracula Has Risen From The Grave. Yes, again. And judging by this junky British film in color—asplatter with catchup or paint or whatever, to simulate the Count's favorite color—he can descend again." Variety called the film "a tired episode," adding, "The story's slight, the horror and the bloodcurdling essential to these pix is minimal and even Dracula himself appears bored at being resurrected yet again." The Monthly Film Bulletin of the UK was somewhat more positive, writing that the film was "rather short on shock sequences" but had "a nice gory opening" and "a suitably horrific finale." Audiences in both Britain and the U.S. applauded the movie, which became Hammer's highest-grossing film. 

The Hammer Story: The Authorised History of Hammer Films called the film "a minor triumph of style over content", writing that the film "succeeds by virtue of Francis' adventurous direction". 
On Rotten Tomatoes the film has an approval rating of 80% based on reviews from 15 critics.

Home media
On 6 November 2007, the film was released as part of a DVD four-pack along with Dracula, Taste the Blood of Dracula, and Dracula A.D. 1972.

On 6 October 2015, the film was released on Blu-ray as part of a Hammer collection pack with The Mummy, Frankenstein Must Be Destroyed, and Taste the Blood of Dracula. It was also released on Blu-ray separately.

See also
 Vampire film

References

Sources

External links

 
 
 
 Online Review with gallery

1968 films
1968 horror films
British sequel films
Hammer Film Productions horror films
Dracula films
Resurrection in film
Films directed by Freddie Francis
Films scored by James Bernard
Films shot at Pinewood Studios
Warner Bros. films
Films set in 1905
Films set in 1906
Dracula (Hammer film series)
Films set in castles
1960s English-language films
1960s British films